Easterlin is a surname. Notable people with the surname include:

John Easterlin, American opera singer
Julia Easterlin (born 1989), American singer-songwriter and musician
Richard Easterlin (born 1926), American economist
Easterlin paradox
Easterlin hypothesis

See also
Easterling (surname)